Francesco I Ventimiglia (1285-2 January 1338) was an Italian nobleman and politician. He inherited the title of Count of Geraci.

Biography
The Ventimiglia of Sicily putatively derive from a noble Frank or Lombard family, descendants of Berengar II of Italy, and ruling the county in Ventimiglia (Liguria) until 1180 when a branch moved to Sicily.

Francesco inherited the title of Count of Geraci from his father, Enrico II. In 1315, he wed Costanza Chiaramonte Mosca, daughter of Manfredi, count of Modica. However ten years later, he repudiated his wife as barren.  He remarried with a noblewoman from the Antiochia family,  counts of Capizzi. However, a feud with the Chiaramonte family would contribute to his ultimate downfall.

Francesco served king Frederick III of Sicily as ambassador to the papal court in Avignon. He fought in Marseille for the Anjou forces. In 1318, he served in a mission to negotiate peace with James II of Aragon. In 1336–1337, he briefly served King Frederick as main Chamberlain or minister, but upon Frederick's death, Peter II of Aragon favored the Palizzi and Chiaramonte families. Francesco's son, called Franceschello, and his secretary, on a mission to the King's court in Palermo, were imprisoned and the secretary was tortured to confess that Francesco and Federico Antiochia were complicit in a plot against King Peter.

The King and his allies forces, including the Chiaramonte, besieged the castle of Geraci, to which Ventimiglia had retired. The facts of his death are unclear, but legend holds he attempted to flee with his weapon and either fell down a cliff or was stabbed (or both) by Francesco di Valguernera, Lord of Godrano. His properties were confiscated but in 1354 returned to two of his children. Francesco was buried in the church of San Bartolomeo in Geraci Siculo.

References

1285 births
1338 deaths
Sicilian nobility
14th-century Sicilian people
Italian politicians